Seasons Greetings from Less Than Jake is an EP by American ska-punk band Less Than Jake, released on February 16, 2012 on Sleep It Off. Released in conjunction with the band's twentieth anniversary, the EP is a follow-up to the band's previous release, Greetings from Less Than Jake (2011). In October 2012, the two EPs were combined to create the full-length album, Greetings and Salutations (2012).

Despite the EP's artwork and title, the band has stated that it is not a festive-themed release, noting, "This is no Christmas record. This is five brand new songs, written and recorded in the winter of late 2011 and very early 2012. This is a companion to our summer EP, Greetings From Less Than Jake. Consider both groups of songs; the salt to the pepper, the peanut butter to the jelly, you get it right?"

Track listing
"The New Auld Lang Syne" - 3:34
"Younger Lungs" - 3:11
"A Return to Headphones" - 2:48
"Done and Dusted" - 3:12
"Finer Points of Forgiveness" - 2:35

Personnel

Less Than Jake
Chris Demakes - vocals, guitar
Roger Manganelli - vocals, bass guitar
Peter "JR" Wasilewski - saxophone
Buddy Schaub - trombone
Vinnie Fiorello - drums

Recording personnel
Roger Lima - producer, recording
Stephen Egerton - mixing, mastering

Artwork
JP Flexner

References

Less Than Jake albums
2012 EPs